Alaguz-e Olya (also Romanized as Ālāgūz-e ‘Olyā; also known as Ālāgūz) is a village in Solduz Rural District, in the Central District of Naqadeh County, West Azerbaijan Province, Iran. At the 2006 census, its population was 178, in 43 families.

References 

Populated places in Naqadeh County